Tom Banks (born 27 August 1985), better known by his stage name Lockah, is a Scottish record producer and DJ from Aberdeen. He is a co-founder of the record label Tuff Wax. He resides in Brighton.

Biography
In 2012, Lockah released an EP, titled When U Stop Feeling Like a Weirdo & Become a Threat. In that year, he also released an EP, titled Please Lockah, Don't Hurt 'Em. In 2013, he released an EP, titled Only Built 4 Neon Nites, as well as a collaborative EP with Taste Tester, titled Higher Learning. Lockah's first studio album, Yahoo or the Highway, was released in 2014. His second studio album, It Gets More Cloudy..., was released in 2015.

Style and influences
His musical style has been described by Michael Cragg of The Guardian as "maximal, strangely textured day-glo dance music." Andriana Albert of The Line of Best Fit wrote: "One of the fascinating aspects of Banks' music is his ability to elicit melodies out of heavy-handed synth, sparse techno beats and trembling glistens of effects, all of which create the most strangely fantastic pop ballads."

Discography

Studio albums
 Yahoo or the Highway (2014)
 It Gets More Cloudy... (2015)

EPs
 Aberdeen Truth Vol. 1 (2011)
 When U Stop Feeling Like a Weirdo & Become a Threat (2012)
 Please Lockah, Don't Hurt 'Em (2012)
 Only Built 4 Neon Nites (2013)
 Higher Learning (2013) 
 And Blue Brindle Too (2015)
 Checkmate Drums (2016) 
 Dazzle Ship (2017) 
 Fluorescent Music (2019) 
 Mouth Feel (2020)

Singles
 "Now U Wanna (Offshore Remix)" (2013)
 "Aloe Дива" (2013) 
 "If Loving U Is Wrong, I Don't Want to Be Wrong" (2014)
 "Sports Day" (2016)
 "Bike Tracks" (2016)
 "Mars R-Trax" (2018) 
 "Surf Domination" (2019)

References

External links
 

1985 births
Living people
People from Aberdeen
Scottish record producers
Scottish DJs
Electronic dance music DJs